Ryan Timothy Tannehill III (born July 27, 1988) is an American football quarterback for the Tennessee Titans of the National Football League (NFL). He played college football at Texas A&M, where he was a wide receiver until his junior year, and was drafted eighth overall by the Miami Dolphins in the 2012 NFL Draft. 

Tannehill spent his first seven seasons as the Dolphins' primary starter before being traded to the Titans in 2019. Initially serving as a backup, Tannehill became the starter midway through the season and led the team to the AFC Championship Game. He was also named NFL Comeback Player of the Year and selected to the Pro Bowl. During his next two seasons, Tannehill helped the Titans clinch consecutive division titles.

Early life
Tannehill was born in Lubbock, Texas, and grew up in nearby Big Spring. He attended Big Spring High School, where he played football and basketball, and ran on the track and field team. He played 10 games as a defensive back in his sophomore season. As a junior, he passed for 2,510 yards and rushed for 922 at quarterback. He took his team to the playoffs as a senior, passing for 1,258 yards and rushing for another 617. He had to miss two games due to a separated shoulder in the second game of his senior year. Tannehill also had three receptions for 62 yards and compiled a 39.2 punt average with a long of 84 yards as a senior. He received second-team District 4-4A honors for both his junior and senior seasons. Tannehill left high school a three-star recruit according to Rivals.com.

In track and field, Tannehill competed in hurdling and jumping events. At the 2006 District 4-4A championships, he placed third in the 300 m hurdles (41.24 s) and earned a second-place finish in the triple jump event (13.19 m).

College career

2007 season

Tannehill redshirted his first season (2007) at Texas A&M after turning down offers from the University of Houston, TCU, Tulsa, and UTEP.

2008 season

Before Tannehill's second season, Mike Sherman took over as head coach. In summer camp, Tannehill competed against veteran quarterback Stephen McGee and redshirt sophomore Jerrod Johnson for the starting quarterback position. He finished in third place behind starter Johnson and McGee. Sherman's offense utilizes true receivers and moved Tannehill to a wide receiver position.

In his fifth game, he posted a freshman school record of 210 yards on 12 catches. He had six receptions for 78 yards in the Iowa State game breaking the freshman school record for receptions and receiving yards. Tannehill finished his redshirt freshman season with 844 receiving yards, which was 11 yards shy of breaking Robert Ferguson's record set in 2000. He attempted only one pass as a quarterback the whole season.

Tannehill had expressed his desire to become the starting quarterback at A&M: "I still think of myself as a quarterback; I still want to be a quarterback here at A&M. Hopefully that's the way it turns out. But if things don't happen that way, and Coach thinks I can better help being a receiver, then I guess I'm okay with that."

2009 season

During the 2009 offseason, Tannehill and Jerrod Johnson competed for the starting quarterback position; Johnson won the job.

Tannehill finished the 2009 season with a team-leading 46 receptions for 609 yards and four touchdowns. About 80% of his catches for the season were for first downs or touchdowns. He picked up All-Big 12 Honorable Mention honors for his performance. He only took eight snaps as a quarterback for the entire season.

2010 season

Tannehill continued to play wide receiver during the first six games of the 2010 season. Over those six games, he made 11 catches for 143 yards. He attempted four passes during the season opener.

He saw extensive action at quarterback during the Kansas game, splitting time with starter Jerrod Johnson. Tannehill finished with 12 completions on 16 attempts for 155 yards and three touchdowns. In his first career start at quarterback, Tannehill led the Aggies to a 45–27 victory over Texas Tech. He set a school record with 449 passing yards. He also made a 33-yard pooch punt, his first career kick.

Tannehill quarterbacked the Aggies to a victory over No. 11 Oklahoma, which moved the team into the top 25. He helped the team maintain a ranking in the top 25 with victories over Baylor and No. 9 Nebraska. During the Nebraska game, he punted twice since the starter was injured. He and his team defeated Texas finishing the regular season. Tannehill was recognized with All-Big 12 Honorable Mention honors.

2011 season

In 2011, Tannehill started all 13 games (including the bowl game) at quarterback for the Aggies and was the team captain. He threw for 3,744 yards and 29 touchdowns with 15 interceptions. He completed 61.6% of his passes posting a quarterback rating of 133.2. In addition, he recorded three rushing touchdowns. On Thanksgiving Day, Tannehill lost the final game of the regular season to Texas A&M's rival, the University of Texas, the last time the teams played, to date.

Tannehill concluded his career at Texas A&M as a quarterback with a total of 5,450 passing yards, 42 touchdown passes, and 21 interceptions.

College statistics

Professional career

Miami Dolphins

In the 2012 NFL Draft, the Miami Dolphins selected Tannehill as the eighth overall pick. He was the first quarterback selected by the Dolphins in the first round since Dan Marino went 27th overall in 1983. He became the 17th starting quarterback by the Dolphins since Marino and only the third quarterback taken in the first round in franchise history after Hall of Famers Bob Griese and Marino.

2012 season: Rookie year

On July 28, 2012, Tannehill signed his four-year rookie contract with the Dolphins worth about $12.688 million, with a fifth-year option.

On August 20, 2012, Tannehill was named the starting quarterback for the season opener against the Houston Texans. He finished with 219 yards, no touchdowns, and three interceptions in the 30–10 loss. Two of his three interceptions were tipped at the line of scrimmage by defensive end J. J. Watt. In response to Tannehill's performance, Dolphins head coach Joe Philbin said, "We've (also) got to do a better job in (pass) protection, and at times the receivers have to protect the throw from the quarterback. So I would say, as is usually the case, there is a little bit of culpability across the board".

During Week 2, Tannehill improved dramatically in a 35–13 win over the Oakland Raiders. He passed for 200 yards, a touchdown, and no interceptions, as well as 14 yards on the ground to go along with a rushing score. Tannehill seemed to fix his tipped ball problem by having zero passes batted down in week 2. By the end of week 3, Tannehill had completed less than 53% of his passes, and also had only one touchdown to four interceptions.

Two weeks later against the Arizona Cardinals, Tannehill threw for 431 yards surpassing the Dolphins' single-game record for most passing yards by a rookie quarterback set by Dan Marino in 1983. Tannehill's mark was one yard shy of the NFL's single-game passing-yard record by a rookie quarterback, set by Panthers quarterback Cam Newton in 2011. He threw a touchdown and two interceptions in the 24–21 overtime loss to the Cardinals. In Week 16, Tannehill set a franchise record for longest run by a quarterback by rushing 31 yards in a single play. The previous record was held by Pat White, who had a 30-yard run in 2009. During that game against the Buffalo Bills, Tannehill also became the fifth quarterback in team history to surpass 3,000 passing yards in a season.

Tannehill went on to set franchise rookie records for passing yards, attempts, and completions.

2013 season

In Week 1, Tannehill started his second season on the road against the Cleveland Browns. He went 24 of 38 for 272 yards a touchdown, and an interception, and was sacked four times in the 23–10 win. In the next game, Tannehill went 23 of 34 for 319 yards for a touchdown, but he was sacked five times and lost a fumble in the 24–20 road victory against the Indianapolis Colts. In Week 3, he went home for the first time, taking on the Atlanta Falcons. He went 24 of 35 for 236 yards for two touchdowns and an interception, got sacked five times, and lost a fumble in the 27–23 victory and led his team to a 3–0 start for the first time since 2002. Tannehill struggled in Week 4 against the New Orleans Saints, going 22 of 35 for 249 yards and a touchdown, but also committed four team turnovers as he was intercepted thrice and lost a fumble. He was sacked four times in the 38–17 road loss.

During Week 5 against the Baltimore Ravens, Tannehill went 21 of 40 for 307 yards and a touchdown, but he was sacked six times in the 26–23 loss. Two weeks later against the Buffalo Bills, Tannehill went 19 of 37 for 194 yards and threw three touchdowns and two interceptions, while fumbling once to the Bills and being sacked twice in the 23–21 loss. In the next game against the New England Patriots, he went 22 of 42 for 192 yards and two touchdowns and two interceptions. He lost a fumble and was sacked six times in the 27–17 road loss. In the next game against the Cincinnati Bengals, Tannehill went 20 of 28 for 208 yards along with a 1-yard touchdown run despite being sacked six times due to the tottering offensive line in the 22–20 overtime victory.

During Week 10 against the Tampa Bay Buccaneers, Tannehill went 27 of 42 for 229 yards while throwing two touchdowns, one interception, and two sacks in the 22–19 road loss. In the next game against the San Diego Chargers, Tannehill completed 22 of 35 pass attempts for 268 yards, a touchdown, and an interception in a 20–16 win, despite being sacked four times.

During Week 14 against the Pittsburgh Steelers, Tannehill completed 20 of his 33 attempts with three touchdowns, one interception, and two sacks in a 34–28 road victory. In the next game against the Patriots, Tannehill had his best game of the year, going 25 of 37 for 312 yards with three touchdowns and no interceptions. He was sacked four times in the 24–20 win. During Week 16 against the Bills, Tannehill followed up his best game with a lackluster performance going 10 of 27 for 82 yards and was sacked seven times in the 19–0 road loss. In the regular-season finale against the New York Jets, Tannehill went 20 of 40 for 204 yards and one touchdown and three interceptions in the 20–7 loss. This was the only regular-season game in which Tannehill was not sacked. The Dolphins finished with an 8–8 record and missed the playoffs.

2014 season

Mike Sherman was the Dolphins' offensive coordinator in Tannehill's first two NFL seasons, and was the head coach at Texas A&M when Tannehill played there. However, during the 2014 offseason, the Dolphins hired new offensive coordinator Bill Lazor giving Tannehill a new playbook to learn for the first time since high school.

In the season opener against the New England Patriots, Tannehill threw for 178 yards, two touchdowns, and an interception in the 33–20 victory. The Dolphins then went 6–7 over their next 13 games. In the penultimate game of the regular season against the Minnesota Vikings, Tannehill had a season-high 396 passing yards, four touchdowns, and one interception in the 37–35 victory. The Dolphins lost the regular season finale to the New York Jets to finish 8–8 and missing the playoffs.

2015 season

On May 18, 2015, Tannehill signed a six-year, $96 million contract extension with the Dolphins through the 2020 season, making him an unrestricted free agent in 2021.

During a Week 7 victory over the Houston Texans, Tannehill became the 64th quarterback in NFL history to post a perfect 158.3 passer rating. In the same game, Tannehill set the all-time NFL record for consecutive completed passes with 25, completing his first 18 passes of the game and the final 7 of his previous game. (In , Philip Rivers & Nick Foles tied his record, but they did it in one game.) Tannehill then had a rough spell during a Thursday Night game against the New England Patriots, throwing no touchdowns and 2 interceptions in a 36–7 loss. and in three successive games against the Patriots, Buffalo Bills and Eagles fumbled one ball in the end zone for an opposition safety.

On December 6, Tannehill became the fourth quarterback in NFL history to throw for over 3,000 yards in each of his first four seasons in the league. On December 15, he threw for 236 yards and one touchdown in the Dolphins' 31–24 loss to the New York Giants on Monday Night Football. The loss eliminated the Dolphins from the playoff contention for a seventh consecutive year.

Tannehill finished the 2015 season with 4,208 passing yards, 24 touchdowns, and 12 interceptions.

2016 season

In 2016, after a 1–4 start, the Dolphins won six straight games, and finished the season on a 9–2 run and an overall record of 10–6. Tannehill played in 13 games, missing the last three due to an injury he suffered against the Arizona Cardinals. With their Week 16 win over the Buffalo Bills, the Dolphins clinched a winning record and a playoff berth for the first time since 2008.

Tannehill finished the season with a then-career-high 67.1 completion percentage, 2,995 yards, 19 touchdowns and 12 interceptions. Tannehill was inactive in the Dolphins Wild Card loss to the Steelers.

2017 season

On August 3, 2017, Tannehill suffered an injury to his left leg in the team's first non-contact 11-on-11 practice of season. After limping off the field, it was reported that the team feared he tore his ACL and would require season-ending surgery. On August 6, the team signed recently retired quarterback Jay Cutler to act as Tannehill's replacement. On August 11, Tannehill agreed to have surgery to repair the torn ACL, officially keeping him out of the 2017 season. He was placed on injured reserve the following day.

2018 season

On March 1, 2018, head coach Adam Gase announced that Tannehill would continue to be the starting quarterback for the Dolphins.

During the season-opener against the Tennessee Titans, the game was delayed twice due to lightning storms. In his return from injury, Tannehill finished with 230 passing yards, two touchdowns, and two interceptions as the Dolphins won 27–20. Two weeks later, he recorded a 155.3 passer rating and threw for 289 yards and three touchdowns in a 28–20 victory over the Oakland Raiders. He was inactive during the Week 6 game against the Chicago Bears due to a shoulder injury. Brock Osweiler started in Tannehill's place until Week 12. In Week 14, Tannehill was part of the Miracle in Miami 34–33 victory against the New England Patriots. Trailing by five points with seven seconds left, the Dolphins had the ball at their own 31-yard line. Tannehill threw a pass over the middle that was caught by wide receiver Kenny Stills, who lateraled the ball to the right side of the field that was caught by DeVante Parker at midfield. Parker then tossed the ball to running back Kenyan Drake, who ran the ball 52 yards for a touchdown to win the game. Over the last three games of the regular season, Tannehill struggled with a total of one touchdown and three interceptions in the three losses.

Tannehill finished the 2018 season with 1,979 passing yards, 17 touchdowns, and nine interceptions in 11 games and starts.

Tennessee Titans

On March 15, 2019, the Dolphins traded Tannehill and a sixth-round selection in the 2019 NFL Draft to the Tennessee Titans in exchange for a fourth-round selection in the 2020 draft and a seventh-round selection in the 2019 draft. Following the trade, he signed a one-year deal worth $7 million with up to $12 million in incentives.

2019 season: Comeback Player of the Year

During Week 6 against the Denver Broncos, Tannehill replaced Marcus Mariota at quarterback in the second half. He went 13-of-16 with 144 passing yards and an interception in the 16–0 road loss. Tannehill was named as the Titans' starting quarterback for the Week 7 matchup against the Los Angeles Chargers. He finished the game with 312 passing yards, two touchdowns, and an interception in the narrow 23–20 victory. During a Week 12 42–20 victory over the Jacksonville Jaguars, Tannehill was 14-of-18 for 259 yards and two touchdowns. In addition, he ran for 40 yards and two touchdowns. Two weeks later against the Oakland Raiders, Tannehill threw for 391 yards, three touchdowns, and an interception in the 42–21 road victory, earning him AFC Offensive Player of the Week. During Week 16 against the New Orleans Saints, Tannehill threw for 272 yards and three touchdowns in the 38–28 loss. In the regular-season finale against the Houston Texans, he threw for 198 yards and two touchdowns in the 35–14 road victory, taking the Titans to the playoffs as a Wild Card team.

Tannehill finished the 2019 season with 2,742 passing yards, 22 touchdowns, and six interceptions to go along with 43 carries for 185 yards and four touchdowns in 12 games and 10 starts. He also led the league and set franchise-records with a 117.5 quarterback rating and 9.6 yards per attempt. His 70.3 completion percentage also set a franchise record. He was ranked 68th by his fellow players on the NFL Top 100 Players of 2020.

In the Wild Card Game against the defending Super Bowl LIII champion New England Patriots, Tannehill completed eight passes on 15 attempts for 72 yards with a touchdown and interception, and he rushed for 11 yards as the Titans upset the Patriots on the road 20–13. It was the fewest completions and yards by a winning postseason quarterback since Joe Flacco's 4 of 10 for 34 yard performance in 2010. In the Divisional Round against the Baltimore Ravens, Tannehill completed seven passes on 14 attempts for 88 yards and two touchdowns, and he rushed six times for 13 yards and a touchdown as the Titans upset the heavily favored Ravens on the road 28–12. Tannehill joined Terry Bradshaw as the only player in the Super Bowl era to win consecutive playoff games with one or more touchdown passes and fewer than 100 yards passing. In the AFC Championship Game, Tannehill completed 21 passes on 31 attempts for 209 yards and two touchdowns and rushed for 11 yards as the Titans lost to the eventual Super Bowl champion Kansas City Chiefs on the road 35–24. Tannehill was named to his first career Pro Bowl on January 20, 2020, replacing the Super Bowl-bound Patrick Mahomes.
On February 1, 2020, Tannehill was named the NFL Comeback Player of the Year.

2020 season

On March 17, 2020, Tannehill signed a four-year extension with the Titans worth $118 million, with $62 million guaranteed.

During the season-opener against the Denver Broncos, Tannehill threw for 249 yards and two touchdowns during the 16–14 road victory. In the next game, he threw for 239 yards and four touchdowns with no interceptions in a narrow 33–30 victory over the Jacksonville Jaguars. The following week against the Minnesota Vikings, Tannehill passed for 321 yards and an interception in the narrow 31–30 road victory. Two weeks later against the Buffalo Bills, he threw for 195 yards and three touchdowns and rushed for 42 yards and a touchdown during the 42–16 win. In the next game against the Houston Texans, Tannehill threw for 364 yards, four touchdowns, and an interception in the 42–36 overtime victory. During Week 13 against the Cleveland Browns, he threw for 389 yards, three touchdowns, and an interception in the 41–35 loss. Two weeks later against the Detroit Lions, Tannehill threw for 273 yards and three touchdowns and rushed for 21 yards and two touchdowns during the 46–25 win. In the next game against the Green Bay Packers, he threw for 121 yards, a touchdown, and two interceptions and rushed for 55 yards, which included a 45-yard touchdown run, during the 14–40 road loss. In the regular-season finale against the Texans, Tannehill threw for 216 yards and a touchdown and rushed for 38 yards and two touchdowns in the 41–38 road victory.

Tannehill finished the 2020 season with 3,819 passing yards, a career-high 33 touchdowns, and seven interceptions to go along with 43 carries for 266 yards and a career-high seven touchdowns in 16 games and starts. The Titans finished atop the AFC South with an 11–5 record and qualified for the playoffs. In the Wild Card Round against the Baltimore Ravens, Tannehill threw for 165 yards, a touchdown, and an interception during the 13–20 loss. He was ranked 83rd by his fellow players on the NFL Top 100 Players of 2021.

2021 season

In Week 18, Tannehill completed 23 of 32 passes for 287 yards and four touchdowns in a 28–25 win over the Houston Texans, clinching the No. 1 seed in the AFC and Offensive Player of the Week. Tannehill finished the 2021 regular season with 3,734 passing yards, 21 touchdowns, and 14 interceptions to go along with 55 carries for 270 yards and tying a career-high 7 rushing touchdowns in 17 games.

Tannehill led the Titans to back-to-back AFC South titles for the first time in franchise history as well as clinching the #1 seed in the AFC for the first time since 2008. In the Divisional Round against the Cincinnati Bengals, Tannehill threw for 220 yards and a touchdown, but threw three interceptions in the 16–19 loss.

2022 season

In the Titans' 21-20 Week 1 loss to the New York Giants, Tannehill played well, throwing for 266 yards and two touchdowns. However in the Titans' 7-41 loss to the Buffalo Bills the following week where Tannehill threw two interceptions, Tannehill was benched for rookie Malik Willis in the third quarter. He suffered an ankle injury in Week 7 and missed the next two games. He then aggravated the injury in Week 15, missed the following game, before being placed on injured reserve on December 29, 2022.

NFL career statistics

Regular season

Postseason

Records and achievements

NFL records
 Most consecutive pass completions: 25 (tied by Philip Rivers & Nick Foles)

Dolphins franchise records
 Most pass completions in a single season: 392 (2014 Miami Dolphins season)
 Most pass completions by a rookie: 282
 Highest completion percentage, career: 62.2
 Highest completion percentage, season (min. 500 attempts): 66.4
 Most passing yards by a rookie season: 3,294
 Most passing attempts by a rookie: 484
 Longest rush by a quarterback: 48 yards
 Longest rush by a rookie quarterback: 31 yards

Titans franchise records
 Highest passer rating (season): 117.5 (2019)
 Most yards per pass attempt (season): 9.59 (2019)
 Highest completion rate (season): 70.3 (2019)

Personal life
Tannehill and his wife Lauren, whom he met in Panama City, Florida in 2009, married in January 2012. They have two children.

Tannehill is a Christian. He writes "Colossians 3:23", a reference to a Bible verse, along with his name when signing autographs.

Tannehill graduated with a bachelor's degree in biology in May 2011 and had planned to become an orthopedic surgeon specializing in knee injuries.

Tannehill has his own charitable foundation called Achieving Community and Education Success (ACES), which helps high school students with their grades and encourages them to get involved in their community. He also represented Lifewater International for the NFL's 2020 My Cause My Cleats campaign.

See also
List of National Football League annual passer rating leaders
List of NFL quarterbacks who have posted a perfect passer rating

References

External links

 
Tennessee Titans bio
Texas A&M Aggies bio

1988 births
Living people
American Christians
American Conference Pro Bowl players
American football quarterbacks
American football wide receivers
American philanthropists
Ed Block Courage Award recipients
Miami Dolphins players
People from Big Spring, Texas
Players of American football from Texas
Sportspeople from Lubbock, Texas
Tennessee Titans players
Texas A&M Aggies football players